SS William F. Jerman was a Liberty ship built in the United States during World War II.

Construction
William F. Jerman was laid down on 27 November 1944, under a Maritime Commission (MARCOM) contract, MC hull 2393, by J.A. Jones Construction, Brunswick, Georgia; she was sponsored by Mrs. Charles W. Tillett, and launched on 23 December 1944.

History
She was allocated to Black Diamond Steamship Co., on 31 December 1944. On 14 November 1947, she was laid up in the National Defense Reserve Fleet, in Wilmington, North Carolina. On 19 February 1960, she was sold for $70,161, to Bethlehem Steel, for scrapping. She was removed from the fleet on 26 April 1960.

References

Bibliography

 
 
 
 
 

 

Liberty ships
Ships built in Brunswick, Georgia
1944 ships
Wilmington Reserve Fleet